Coyote en Ayuno ("Fasting Coyote"), also known as Coyote Hambriento ("Hungry Coyote") and Cabeza de Coyote ("Coyote Head"), is an outdoor steel sculpture by abstract monumental artist Enrique "Sebastián" Carbajal, installed on a roundabout in the intersection of Adolfo López Mateos Avenue and Pantitlán Avenue, in the municipality of Nezahualcóyotl, State of Mexico. The sculpture, which depicts a red coyote looking skyward, was inaugurated on 23 April 2008 to celebrate the 45th anniversary of the founding of the municipality. The name of the sculpture references the etymology of Nezahualcóyotl.

History and description
It features a red-painted steel coyote looking skyward. It was created by Enrique "Sebastián" Carbajal. It was installed on a roundabout between Adolfo López Mateos Avenue and Pantitlán Avenue, in Ciudad Nezahualcóyotl, State of Mexico, where previously a water tank had been. Due to its height and color, the sculpture can be seen throughout Nezahualcóyotl.

The sculpture was commissioned to Sebastián by the then-mayor of Nezahualcóyotl, Luis Sánchez Jiménez, with a budget of 2 million pesos, and it was to be completed within a year. The cost soared to 5 million pesos and was completed in three years. The Coyote en Ayuno was inaugurated on 23 April 2008 to celebrate the 45th anniversary of the founding of the municipality. According to Sebastián, the eyes face east, so that the first ray of sunlight on 23 April can cross through the eye socket and light is projected onto a commemorative plaque, like a pre-Hispanic ritual. At the time it was inaugurated, the sculpture became the tallest of the country.

In addition, the original project included a space to create a cultural center and a museum, but it did not materialize. By 2018, there were plans to rehabilitate the sculpture and place a museum, but it did not happen due to a lack of budget.

Reception
Like most of Sebastián's works, Coyote en Ayuno received mixed reactions to the artist's style. Many locals at first considered it ugly and disproportionate but later it became a landmark of the municipality.

See also
 Guerrero Chimalli, another sculpture by Sebastián in the neighboring municipality of Chimalhuacán.

References

External links
 

2008 establishments in Mexico
2008 sculptures
Animal sculptures in Mexico
Ciudad Nezahualcóyotl
Mammals in art
Outdoor sculptures in the State of Mexico
Steel sculptures in Mexico